W Hydrae is a Mira-type variable star in the constellation Hydra.
The star is nearly located within the Solar neighborhood, between 75 and 120 parsecs, likely at 320 light years from the Sun. It has a visual apparent magnitude range of 5.6 to 10. In the near-infrared J band it has a magnitude of -1.7, is the 7th brightest star in the night sky, and is even brighter than Sirius.

Water and dust masers 

The star also shows signs of intense water emissions, indicative of the presence of a wide disk of dust and water vapour. Such emissions cover a zone spanning between 10.7 Astronomical Units (within Saturn's orbital zone) and 1.2 parsecs (or nearly 247,500 Astronomical Units, as far away as the Oort Cloud in Solar System).

References

External links
 AAVSO Variable Star of the Month. April 2008: W Hya
 W Hya at AAVSO (chart #8585EPX)

Hydra (constellation)
Mira variables
Hydrae, W
M-type giants
120285
067419
Durchmusterung objects